Sherman Andrés Cárdenas Estupiñán (born 7 August 1989) is a Colombian footballer who plays as an attacking midfielder for Once Caldas.

Career

Atlético Mineiro
In February 2015, Cardenas was announced by the Brazilian club Atlético Mineiro.

International career
At the international level, he was part of the Colombian u-17 team that won the 2006 Central American and Caribbean Games in Cartagena, and played with the Colombian u-20 team at the 2007 South American U-20 Championship in Paraguay, scoring his first international goal against Venezuela on 16 January 2007.

Statistics

Club performance
 Data below could be inaccurate.

Statistics accurate as of last match played on 8 December 2017.

1 Includes cup competitions such as Copa Libertadores and Copa Sudamericana.

2 Includes Superliga Colombiana matches.

3 Includes Campeonato Mineiro matches.

4 Includes Campeonato Baiano and Liga do Nordeste matches.

Honours

Club
Junior de Barranquilla
 Categoría Primera A (1): 2011-II

Atlético Nacional
 Categoría Primera A (3): 2013-I, 2013-II, 2014-I
 Copa Colombia (1): 2013

Atlético Mineiro
 Campeonato Mineiro: 2015

Vitória
 Campeonato Baiano: 2017

References

1989 births
Living people
Colombian footballers
Colombia international footballers
Colombia youth international footballers
Colombia under-20 international footballers
Colombian expatriate footballers
Association football midfielders
Categoría Primera A players
Campeonato Brasileiro Série A players
Ecuadorian Serie A players
Atlético Bucaramanga footballers
Millonarios F.C. players
La Equidad footballers
Atlético Junior footballers
Atlético Nacional footballers
Clube Atlético Mineiro players
Esporte Clube Vitória players
L.D.U. Quito footballers
Colombian expatriate sportspeople in Brazil
Colombian expatriate sportspeople in Ecuador
Expatriate footballers in Brazil
Expatriate footballers in Ecuador
People from Bucaramanga
Sportspeople from Santander Department